Hussein Al Oweini (24 December 1900 – 11 January 1971) was a Lebanese businessman and politician who served as Prime Minister of Lebanon twice. He also held other cabinet positions.

Early life
Oweini was born in 1900. He hailed from a Sunni family based in Beirut.

Career
Oweini worked in Saudi Arabia as a business agent for the House of Saud from 1923 to 1947. He founded a company, Ne'ma Te'ma, in Riyadh. He had also business investments in Beirut and was one of the shareholders of Air Liban through the Busson Group. The other members of the Busson Group included Antoine Sahnawi, Michel Khattar, and Georges Karam.

Oweini was the minister of finance from July 1948 to June 1951. He was first appointed interim prime minister on 14 February 1951 under President Bechara El Khoury succeeding Riad Al Solh in the post. Oweini was in office until 7 April 1951 and succeeded by Abdullah Yafi. In 1951 Oweini cofounded BLOM Bank in Lebanon.

On 27 September 1957, Oweini and two other former prime ministers, Saeb Salam and Abdallah El-Yafi, were arrested on charges of planning an armed coup and riots during the elections held in May. Oweini's second term as prime minister was from 20 February 1964 to 25 July 1965 under President Charles Helou. Both his predecessor and successor was Rashid Karami as prime minister. Oweini was the leader of the National Front. He also served as the minister of foreign affairs and emigrants for three separate terms, from 1958 to 1960, in 1965, and 1968 to 1969. During his third term as foreign minister, Oweini also acted as minister of national defense.

Personal life and death
One of Oweini's daughter is Nada Oweini who is one of the shareholders of the BLOM Bank and the wife of Saudi-Lebanese businessman Ghassan Chaker. Oweini died on 11 January 1971, aged 70. After his death, the Hussein Al Oweini Award was initiated in his honor.

References

External links

20th-century Lebanese businesspeople
1900 births
1971 deaths
Defense ministers of Lebanon
Finance ministers of Lebanon
Foreign ministers of Lebanon
Grand Crosses 1st class of the Order of Merit of the Federal Republic of Germany
Government ministers of Lebanon
Lebanese corporate directors
Lebanese Sunni Muslims
Politicians from Beirut
Prime Ministers of Lebanon
Lebanese bankers